Joseph Borremans (25 November 1775 in Brussels – 15 May 1858 in Brussels) was a composer, organist and conductor in the United Kingdom of the Netherlands.

In Brussels, he was Kapellmeister at the St. Michael and St. Gudula Cathedral (until 1835?), organist of the Saint Nicholas' Church and second conductor of the Theatre of the Mint where, amongst others, the next works were performed:

 Klapperman ou le Crieur de nuit d'Amsterdam, Opéra comique in one act performed on 31 October 1804;
 La Femme impromptue, Opera buffa performed in 1808;
 Offrande à Vlujmen, scène lyrique performed on 31 October 1816.
  
As an organist, he was noted for his improvisational abilities. As a religious composer, he wrote Masses, Te Deum’s, motets, etc. with orchestral accompaniment.  
  
The composer Charles Borremans was his eldest brother.

References

1775 births
1858 deaths
Belgian classical composers
Belgian male classical composers
Classical-period composers
Romantic composers
Musicians from Brussels
19th-century classical composers
19th-century Dutch male musicians